United Nations Security Council Resolution 182, adopted on December 4, 1963, after the Republic of South Africa refused to co-operate with Resolution 181, the Council again requested South Africa comply with previous resolutions and that all States comply with resolution 181.  The Council then requested the Secretary-General establish a small group of experts to examine ways of resolving the situation in South Africa and that he report back to the Council no later than June 1, 1964.

The resolution was adopted unanimously by all 11 members of the Council.

See also
List of United Nations Security Council Resolutions 101 to 200 (1953–1965)
South Africa under apartheid

References
Text of the Resolution at undocs.org

External links
 

 0182
1963 in South Africa
 0182
December 1963 events